Michael G. Jacobides  is a British economist and public speaker. His main areas of interest are digital platforms and ecosystems, financial services and turnarounds. He is the Sir Donald Gordon Chair of Entrepreneurship & Innovation at London Business School. He is Academic Advisor to the Boston Consulting Group, Chief Expert Advisor on Digital Economy to the Hellenic Competition Commission, visiting scholar at the New York Fed, and visiting fellow at Cambridge University.

Jacobides is also the founder and lead advisor of Evolution ltd, providing Advisory Services and Thought Leadership to the corporate world.

In 2019, Jacobides was selected as one of the Thinkers50, the top 50 management thinkers worldwide, where he was recognized for his expertise on business ecosystems, and how firms navigate shifting, digital environments. A frequent keynote speaker, he's engaged in corporate, industry, and broad-appeal events such as TEDx and the Global Drucker Forum.

Jacobides’ work has received the Sloan Foundation Award. His 2018 article, "Towards a Theory of Ecosystems" (co-authored with Carmelo Cennamo & Prof Annabelle Gawer), is the most read article in SMJ.

Research 
In addition to being a senior faculty in LBS, Jacobides is a visiting fellow in Cambridge, a visiting scholar at the New York Fed, and has spent some time in various peer institutions such as Wharton (where he earned his PhD) and then just before tenure, 6 months in Harvard Business School, and over a year in NYU, when he was splitting his time between London and New York in the early 2010's. He has been a visiting faculty in Bocconi, Imperial College Business School, a Distinguished Visiting Professor in Singapore Management University, and a Professeur Visite in University of Paris. He has given over 150 talks.

Jacobides’ publication preferences, tend to be primarily for journals such as SMJ, OrgSci, AMJ, AMR, ResPol, along with new journals, such as Strategy Science. He occasionally submits papers in other related fields, such as Business History as well as the top managerial outlets, such as Harvard Business Review, Sloan Management Review, and LBS thought leadership journal called Think!

Advisory work 
Due to growing interest in digital platforms and ecosystems, Jacobides’ work in this area in terms of research and practice has also grown, branching from strategy to policy. He has also worked on how COVID19 is speeding up structural change, and explored the dynamics of the AI ecosystem and has focused his Advisory work to BCG and the Henderson Institute on digital strategy, AI, and ecosystems.

He undertakes most of his advisory work as the Lead Advisor of Evolution Ltd, a boutique advisory focusing on the intersection of technology, strategy and policy. From 2019, Evolution Ltd has produced a number of White Papers and frameworks, expanding into the design of technology solutions. He's continued working with Keystone and other advisories and corporates, from Haier to Match.com, using insights gained to make sure that his academic work has its roots firmly grounded. He is a member of the advisory board of ventures like Grapevine, MyLocalToken, Velocia and FoundersLane.

References

External links
Website
evolutionltd.net

British economists
Living people
Academics of London Business School
Year of birth missing (living people)